Osmanthus yunnanensis is a species of flowering plant in the olive family Oleaceae, native to Yunnan and Sichuan in the far south west of China. In winter and spring, small clusters of white flowers in the leaf axils produce an intense fragrance. 

This plant was introduced to Britain by the Scottish botanist and planthunter George Forrest in 1927.
There is a thriving specimen in St Andrews Botanic Garden in south east Scotland. It has gained the Royal Horticultural Society’s Award of Garden Merit.

Etymology
Osmanthus is derived from Greek and means 'fragrant flower'.

Yunnanensis means 'from Yunnan Province, China.'

References

Flora of Yunnan
Flora of Sichuan
yunnanensis